Chaoyangmen Outer Street is a major through route in Beijing, China, and runs through the Chaowai area near Chaoyangmen. Geographically, it is in the eastern urban area, and is still considered very close to the city centre even though it lies outside the 2nd Ring Road. It is north of a similarly significant area, the future Beijing CBD.

Chaoyangmen Outer Street runs from Chaoyangmen Bridge through to the massive Dongdaqiao crossing. In its path lie office blocks, shopping areas, and technology stores (including the Bainaohui area), making it one of the busiest streets in Beijing. Traffic is often congested, especially near the nodal points Chaoyangmen and Dongdaqiao.

History 
Chaoyangmen was originally called "Qihuamen". Chaoyangmenwai Street is the road to the Qiyangmen Gate during the Yuan Dynasty, the Chaoyangmen Guanxiang area during the Ming and Qing Dynasties and the Republic of China. During the Qing Dynasty the road was paved. In 1942 the road was repaved. After the founding of the People's Republic of China, the asphalt pavement was widened and refurbished in 1953. In 1988, a large-scale expansion and reconstruction was carried out. In 1990 the street was extended eastward to the East Third Ring Road and was connected to Chaoyang Road.

Over the years, many temples were built along Chaoyangmenwai Street, among them the Tianxian Temple (built during the Ming Dynasty, destroyed), Jiutian Puhua Palace (built 1647 during the Qing Dynasty), Dongyue Temple (built in the Yuan Dynasty), and Ci Zun Temple (destroyed). Dongyue Temple is located in the central section of Chaoyangmenwai Street. In the 1950s, the east and west arches on Chaoyangmenwai Street were demolished. Since the 1950s, Dongyue Temple was occupied by a unit of the Beijing Municipal Public Security Bureau. In 1988, the gates facing Chaoyangmenwai Street were dismantled, thus making the bell tower, the drum tower and the two doors directly face each other. After renovation in 1998, it was opened as a Beijing Folk Museum. In 2008, Dongyue Temple was restored as a place of religious activity. Since then, it has the dual functions of museum and Taoist temple.

Office buildings and retail along Chaoyangmen Outer Street received a major boost in 1996 when China opened its Ministry of Foreign Affairs on this arterial. Other high rises that were built along Chaoyangmen Outer Street include: China Life Tower, Chaoyangmenwai Soho, Guangyao Apartment Tower, Guoan Mansion, Jingguang Centre, and the World Financial Center. Beijing's new CBD is developing to the south of Chaoyangmenwai Street.

Attractions
 The famous Beijing Dongyue Temple (built and developed 1319 and onwards) is located along Chaoyangmen Outer Street. It is a national cultural spot of China and hosts the Beijing Folk Customs Museum.
 Pfidang or Memorial archway, a glazed tile archway opposite Dongyue Temple's Sun Gate, on the south side of Chaoyangmen Outer Street and at the entrance of Shenlu Street.

References

Streets in Beijing
Road transport in Beijing
Chaoyang District, Beijing